Verrières is the name or part of the name of several communes in France:

 Verrières, Ardennes
 Verrières, Aube
 Verrières, Aveyron
 Verrières, Charente
 Verrières, Marne
 Verrières, Orne
 Verrières, Puy-de-Dôme
 Verrières, Vienne
 Verrières-de-Joux, Doubs department
 Verrières-du-Grosbois, Doubs department
 Verrières-en-Forez, Loire department
 Verrières-le-Buisson, Essonne department

In fiction
Verrières, a fictional village in Stendhal's Le Rouge et le Noir (The Red and the Black)

See also
 Veyrières (disambiguation)